Niklas Mackschin (born 2 October 1994 in Hanover) is a German racing driver, that has competed in both the European Touring Car Cup and the ADAC Procar series. He is the current ETCC Super 1600 champion, having won first time in 2015.

Career
In 2015 he became the champion in ETCC Super 1600, in his debut season. In 2016 he made his TCR International Series début.

Racing record

Complete TCR International Series results
(key) (Races in bold indicate pole position) (Races in italics indicate fastest lap)

References

German racing drivers
1984 births
Living people
Sportspeople from Hanover

Engstler Motorsport drivers
TCR International Series drivers
European Touring Car Cup drivers